This is presenting a complete list in alphabetical order of the cricketers who have played for the Bangladesh national under-23 cricket team in first-class, List A and Twenty20 cricket.

A
 Abdur Razzak
 Abu Jayed
 Arafat Sunny
 Ariful Haque
 Asif Ahmed

D
 Dhiman Ghosh

F
 Faisal Hossain

G
 Gazi Alamgir

I
 Imran Ahmed

K
 Kamrul Islam Rabbi

L
 Liton Das

M
 Mahmudul Hasan
 Mizanur Rahman
 Mohammad Mithun
 Myshukur Rahaman

N
 Naeem Islam
 Nasiruddin Faruque
 Nazimuddin
 Mohammad Nazmul Islam
 Noor Hossain
 Nurul Hasan

R
 Rony Talukdar
 Rumman Ahmed

S
 Sabbir Rahman
 Shahriar Nafees
 Soumya Sarkar
 Syed Rasel

T
 Taijul Islam

References

Under-23